Askin is a surname. Notable people with the surname include:

Ambrose Askin, British rugby player
Frank Askin, professor and activist
John Askin (1739–1815), fur trader in Canada
John Askin Jr. (c1765–1820), fur trader and government official in Canada; son of John
Leon Askin, Austrian actor
Matty Askin, British boxer
Peter Askin (born 1940), American director and screenwriter 
Robert Askin, Australian politician
Stephen Askin, inventor of the deely bobber
Tom Askin, British rugby player

See also
Askin, Iran, a village in Markazi Province, Iran
Eskin-e Olya, Iran
Eskin-e Sofla, Iran